Brevis commentarius de Islandia (English: "Brief Commentary on Iceland") is a book in Latin written and published in Denmark in 1593 by the Icelandic scholar Arngrímur Jónsson. It is a "Defense of Iceland", in which he criticized the works of numerous authors who had written about the people and the country of Iceland. His main target was a poem by Gories Peerse, a merchant who had written an entertaining and somewhat slanderous poem about Icelandic geography and ethnography. Arngrímur also criticized substantial works such as Cosmographia universalis of the German scholar Sebastian Münster.

The Brevis commentarius de Islandia was reprinted in 1598 in Richard Hakluyt's Principal Navigations of the English Nation. This defense of Iceland and subsequent works were important for introducing European scholars to the ancient literature of Iceland and the richness of the manuscripts present there. 

European literature
1593 books
16th-century Latin books